Iñuma (Aymara, Hispanicized spelling Inuma) is a mountain in the Barroso mountain range in the Andes of Peru, about  high. It is situated in the Tacna Region, Tacna Province, Palca District, and in the Tarata Province, Tarata District. Iñuma lies northeast of Coruña, north of Awki Taypi and northwest of the Casiri massif.

See also 
 Achacollo
 Huancune

References 

Mountains of Peru
Mountains of Tacna Region